This is a list of seasons played by Hapoel Hadera Football Club in Israeli and European football, from 1939–40 (when the club first competed in the league) to the most recent completed season. It details the club's achievements in major competitions, and the top scorers for each season. Top scorers in bold were also the top scorers in the Israeli league that season. Records of minor competitions such as the Lilian Cup are not included due to them being considered of less importance than the State Cup and the Toto Cup.

History
Hapoel Hadera was established in 1928, playing mostly friendly before joining the league in 1939. The club was first promoted to the top division in 1954, surviving only one season before relegation back to the second division. The club spent another seven seasons in the top division during the 1970s, before being relegated back to the lower divisions.

Seasons

Key

 P = Played
 W = Games won
 D = Games drawn
 L = Games lost
 F = Goals for
 A = Goals against
 Pts = Points
 Pos = Final position

 Leumit = Liga Leumit (National League)
 Artzit = Liga Artzit (Nationwide League)
 Premier = Liga Al (Premier League)
 Pal. League = Palestine League

 F = Final
 Group = Group stage
 QF = Quarter-finals
 QR1 = First Qualifying Round
 QR2 = Second Qualifying Round
 QR3 = Third Qualifying Round
 QR4 = Fourth Qualifying Round
 RInt = Intermediate Round

 R1 = Round 1
 R2 = Round 2
 R3 = Round 3
 R4 = Round 4
 R5 = Round 5
 R6 = Round 6
 SF = Semi-finals

Notes

References

Hapoel Hadera F.C.
 
Hapoel Hadera